The Benin Women's Championship is the top flight of women's association football in Benin. The competition is run by the Benin Football Federation.

History
The first Benin women's championship was contested on 2002. It was won by Flèche Noire SC.

Champions
The list of champions and runners-up:

Most successful clubs

References

External links 
 Febefoot official fb page

Women's association football leagues in Africa
Football competitions in Benin
Women
2002 establishments in Benin
Sports leagues established in 2002
Women's sport in Benin